The regional finals of the 2016 Capcom Pro Tour were a series of closed Street Fighter V tournaments held throughout the world. The champions of the four different regions – North America, Latin America, Europe, and Asia – automatically qualified to compete at the 2016 Capcom Cup. People qualified to compete in their regional finals by scoring highly on their regional leaderboard or winning ranking events during the 2016 Capcom Pro Tour. The four tournaments all took place between October 15 and November 19, 2016.

General background
During the 2016 Capcom Pro Tour, people competing at any of its 72 tournaments gained points on both the "regional" or "global" leaderboard, the former of which depending on the location of the tournament. Among these 72 tournaments, twelve "ranking events" and two "online events" were held in each region. The champion of each of these 14 events qualified for their regional finals, while 18 more qualified by placing high on the regional leaderboards. The four champions of the regional finals all automatically qualified to compete at the 2016 Capcom Cup.

Tournaments
Four regional finals took place throughout the world between October 15 and November 19, 2016. These events were held in Europe, Latin America, North America, and Asia.

Europe
The European regional finals of the 2016 Capcom Cup were the first of the four events, held during the Milan Games Week in Milan, Italy on October 15–16. The tournament, produced by FACEIT Media, featured an open 256 player "Last Chance Qualifier" on the first day, the top two players of which qualifying for the 16-player regional finals taking place on day 2. The Last Chance Qualifier was won by two Japanese players: Naoto Sako and Masato "Bonchan" Takahashi. Other Asian players who won enough European tournaments to qualify for the European regional finals included Daigo Umehara, Joe "MOV" Egami, and Kun Xian Ho. Besides these, the finals featured eleven high-level European players such as Olivier "Luffy" Hay. The regional finals was eventually won by Daigo Umehara, who defeated Arman "Phenom" Hanjani in the grand finals.

Latin America
The Latin American regional finals were held on Wednesday, November 2 in São Paulo. Like the European finals, the Latin American event featured an open Last Chances Qualifier before the main tournament. The Latin American regional finals was won by Dominican competitor Ray "DR Ray" Rosario, who, playing as Vega defeated the Brazilian Diego "Dark817" Lins Gois and the American Kenneth "K-Brad" Bradley in the final rounds. Brazilian favorite Keoma "Keoma" Pacheco was defeated by K-Brad in the semi-finals.

North America
The North American finals were hosted by Red Bull GmbH and held on November 4 to 6 in the Seattle Exhibition Hall. The first two days of the event featured an open bracket of 1,024 competitors, while the official qualifying tournament was held on the final day. The event was named the Red Bull Battlegrounds and was described by PC Gamer as a "high-budget, extremely well produced event," akin to a television game show. After the conclusion of the tournament, the character Akuma was announced to be added to the game.

The top eight of the tournament featured a large number of well-established American players, such as Justin Wong, K-Brad, and Ricki Ortiz. The finals of Red Bull Battlegrounds was held between NuckleDu and Tokido. NuckleDu lost to Tokido in the first round of the top eight, but managed to come back through the loser's bracket and face Tokido again in the finale, where he defeated him through a bracket-reset. As NuckleDu had already qualified for the Capcom Cup, the qualifying spot opened up for another player on the global leaderboard.

Asia
Australia's Battle Arena Melbourne 8 and OzHadou Nationals were two of the twelve ranking events for the Asian regional finals. The Asian regional finals took place on October 17–19 at the Global Game Exhibition in Busan, South Korea. The tournament was won by Kenryo "Mago" Hayashi, beating Joe "MOV" Egami in the grand finals. As Mago had already qualified for the Capcom Cup, his qualifying spot went on to Tse "Tse4444" Wa Ping, who was ranked eleventh in the Asian leaderboard.

References

2016 fighting game tournaments
Capcom Cup